(March 13, 1656 – September 15, 1678) was a Japanese daimyō of the Edo period, who ruled the Tokushima Domain. His court title was Awa no kami.

Family
 Father: Hachisuka Mitsutaka
 Mother: Kinhime (d.1703)
 Wife: Reishoin

Reference

1656 births
1678 deaths
Daimyo
Hachisuka clan